Prince Adam Kazimierz Czartoryski (1 December 1734 – 19 March 1823) was an influential Polish aristocrat, writer, literary and theater critic, linguist, traveller and statesman. He was a great patron of arts and a candidate for the Polish crown. He was educated in England and after his return to Poland in 1758, he became a member of the Sejm (parliament), Crown General of Podolia and Marshal of General Confederation of Kingdom of Poland.

Biography

Early life
He was the son of Prince August Aleksander Czartoryski, voivode of the Ruthenian Voivodeship, and Maria Zofia Sieniawska. He married Izabela Fleming on 18 November 1761, in Wołczyn, Poland.

Political career

A member of the Familia, in 1763 he declined to be a candidate for the Polish crown, preferring instead to be a patron of the arts, and withdrawing in favor of Stanisław August Poniatowski. With his wife, Izabela Czartoryska,  he created at the Czartoryski Palace in Puławy a major center of Polish intellectual and political life.

He served from 1758 as general starost of Podolia. Founder of the "Little Monitor", in 1765 he co-founded the Monitor, the leading periodical of the Polish Enlightenment. In 1766 he reorganized the army of the Grand Duchy of Lithuania. In 1767 he joined the Radom Confederation. In 1768 he became the commander of the School of Chivalry (Corps of Cadets). In 1788-1792 he was Deputy from Lublin to the "Four-Year Sejm." Drawing closer the king once again, he became a leader of the Patriotic Party and co-founder of Poland's Commission of National Education. He supported the Polish Constitution of 3 May 1791, and headed a diplomatic mission to Dresden, attempting to convince Frederick Augustus III, Elector of Saxony to support the Commonwealth and accept its throne (after Poniatowski's future death). He refused to join the Targowica Confederation established to bring the Constitution down.

He received the Order of the White Eagle on 25 November 1764.

He was Marshal of the Convocation Sejm of 7 May - 23 June 1764, and of the Extraordinary Sejm of 26–28 June 1812, held in Warsaw. Thus he became Marshal of General Confederation of Kingdom of Poland.

Remembrance
He is one of the figures immortalized in Jan Matejko's 1891 painting, Constitution of May 3, 1791.

Awards

 Order of the White Eagle (25 November 1764)
 Order of Saint Stanisław
 Order of St. Andrew (1762)
 Order of St. Anna
 Knight of the Order of the Golden Fleece (Austria) (1808)

Works
Czartoryski was an author of numerous comedies and plays. He has also written a critical essay on contemporary Polish literature, Myśli o pismach polskich [Thoughts on Polish Writings] (1810).

 Panna na wydaniu (1771).
 Katechizm kadecki (The Cadet's Catechism, 1774).
 Kawa (Coffee, 1779).
 Myśli o pismach polskich [Thoughts on Polish Writings] (1810).

See also
 Adam Jerzy Czartoryski

References

1734 births
1823 deaths
Writers from Gdańsk
Field marshals of Austria
Candidates for the Polish elective throne
Generals of the Polish–Lithuanian Commonwealth
Polish male writers
18th-century philanthropists
Polish philanthropists
Marshals of the Sejm of a Partitioned Poland
Members of the Sejm of Duchy of Warsaw
Adam Kazimierz Czartoryski
Recipients of the Order of St. Anna
Knights of the Golden Fleece of Austria
Politicians from Gdańsk
18th-century Polish–Lithuanian landowners
19th-century Polish landowners
Recipients of the Order of the White Eagle (Poland)